The Zangger Committee, also known as the Nuclear Exporters Committee, sprang from Article III.2 of the Treaty on the Non-Proliferation of Nuclear Weapons (NPT) which entered into force on March 5, 1970. Under the terms of Article III.2 International Atomic Energy Agency (IAEA) safeguards must be applied to nuclear exports.

Each State Party to the Treaty undertakes not to provide: (a) source or special fissionable material, or (b) equipment or material especially designed or prepared for the processing, use or production of special fissionable material, to any non-nuclear-weapon State for peaceful purposes, unless the source or special fissionable material shall be subject to the safeguards required by this Article.

History
Between 1971 and 1974, a group of 15 nuclear supplier states held a series of informal meetings in Vienna chaired by Professor Claude Zangger of Switzerland. The group's objective was to reach a common understanding on: (a) the definition of "equipment or material especially designed or prepared for the processing, use or production of special fissionable material;" and (b) the conditions and procedures that would govern exports of such equipment or material in order to meet the obligations of Article III.2 on the basis of fair commercial competition. The group, which became known as the Zangger Committee, decided that it would be informal and that its decisions would not be legally binding upon its members.

The committee (a) maintains and updates a list of equipment that may only be exported if safeguards are applied to the recipient facility (called the "Trigger List" because such exports trigger the requirement for safeguards); and (b) allows members to coordinate on nuclear export issues. The relative informality of the Zangger Committee has enabled it to take the lead on certain nonproliferation issues that would be more difficult to resolve in the Nuclear Suppliers Group. Moreover, the People's Republic of China is a member of the Zangger Committee.

At the October 2000 meeting, the committee discussed the results of the 2000 NPT Review Conference (REVCON). The committee agreed to form two informal "Friends of the Chair" groups to: 1) consider preparations for the 2005 NPT REVCON; and 2) continue consideration of possible future adoption of a policy of requiring full-scope safeguards as a condition of supply to non-nuclear weapon states. The U.S. reported on the status of consideration of possible additional controls on americium and neptunium. Members agreed that these materials fell outside the scope of NPT Article III.2 for inclusion on the Trigger List. Sweden, chair of a working group to consider addition of plutonium enrichment equipment to the Trigger List, reported no agreement as yet. The chairman reported on an initial informal meeting with IAEA staff to discuss procedures for keeping the agency informed on Trigger List changes and the rationale for such changes, since the agency uses the Zangger Trigger List as a reference document.

Chairs
The following have served as chairs of the Zangger Committee:

1971–1989: Dr. Claude Zangger (Switzerland)
1989–1993: Ilkka Mäkipentti (Finland)
1993–2005: Fritz Schmidt (Austria)
2006–2010: Pavel Klucký (Czech Republic)
2010–2015: Shawn Caza (Canada)
2015–present: Louise Fluger Callesen (Denmark)

The United Kingdom Mission to the United Nations Office at Vienna acts as the committee's secretariat.

Members
There are 39 Members States in the Zangger Committee:

 Argentina
 Australia
 Austria
 Belarus
 Belgium
 Bulgaria
 Canada
 China
 Croatia
 Czech Republic
 Denmark
 Finland
 France
 Germany
 Greece
 Hungary
 Ireland
 Italy
 Japan
 Kazakhstan
 South Korea
 Luxembourg
 Netherlands
 New Zealand
 Norway
 Poland
 Portugal
 Romania
 Russia
 Slovakia
 Slovenia
 South Africa
 Spain
 Sweden
 Switzerland
 Turkey
 Ukraine
 United Kingdom
 United States

The  European Commission is a permanent observer.

External links
 Official Zangger Committee Website
 Zangger Committee Understandings

References

This article incorporates a fact sheet was released by the Bureau of Nonproliferation and distributed by the Office of International Information Programs (both part of the U.S. Department of State). Web site: .

Nuclear weapons governance